Six-Milles is an unincorporated community in Restigouche County, New Brunswick, Canada.

History

Notable people

See also
List of communities in New Brunswick

References

Communities in Restigouche County, New Brunswick